Isophrictis sabulella is a moth of the family Gelechiidae. It was described by Walsingham in 1888. It is found in North America, where it has been recorded from California.

The wingspan is 14-15.5 mm. The forewings are fawn-colour with a slight brownish tinge towards the apex, where there is some appearance of pale speckling owing to the tips of the scales about the cilia and apical margin being of a lighter hue. The hindwings are fawn colour, with a greyish tinge.

References

Moths described in 1888
Isophrictis